Weird! is the second studio album by English singer Yungblud, released on 4 December 2020 by Locomotion and Interscope Records. Originally scheduled for 13 November 2020, the album's release was delayed due to the COVID-19 pandemic. It is Yungblud's first album since 21st Century Liability (2018). The album was supported by six singles: "Weird!", "Strawberry Lipstick", "God Save Me, but Don't Drown Me Out", "Cotton Candy", "Mars" and "Acting Like That", and contains collaborations with Machine Gun Kelly and Travis Barker. 

Weird! debuted at number 1 on the UK Albums Chart selling 39,000 units in its first week.

Background
On 2 December 2019, Yungblud shared on social media that he was going "a little mia" to work on his second record. The next day, he clarified that he was not taking time off, just taking time to finish the second album. On 3 December, Matt Schwartz posted photos of himself and Harrison on his Instagram, with the caption stating that they were working on the second studio album in Spain.

Throughout the process of making the album, he would occasionally tweet out pieces of poems that appeared to be lyrics to songs. In May 2020, during an NME interview he was asked about the album, replying: "The album is done and we're going to start rolling it out. [Weird!] is the first chess move of that era. There's a lot of diversity on [the album] – it's like an episode of Skins in an album. Since the beginning of time, humans have been so complex and like 15 different personalities at once – but we're the first generation to accept it and know that it's alright to be who you are." The cover is made to imitate the film poster for This Is England.

Track listing

Note
 All track titles are stylized in lowercase

Personnel

Musicians
 Yungblud – vocals (all tracks), guitar (1–8, 11, 13), bass guitar (1, 3, 6, 8, 11, 13, 14), keyboards (5, 9), programming (5), background vocals (7, 9), percussion (7, 9)
 Chris Greatti - guitar (1–8, 11, 14), bass guitar (1, 3–8, 10, 11, 13, 14), background vocals (3, 8, 9, 12), programming (4, 5), drums (5), keyboards (5, 7, 9), strings (7)
 Adam Warrington - guitar (1, 4, 5, 9)
 Omer Fedi - bass guitar (1, 5, 6), keyboards (5), programming (5, 7)
 Zakk Cervini – programming (1–9, 11, 14), drums (4, 5, 7), percussion (4), keyboards (5), vocal programming (12)
 Michael Rennie - drums (5, 9), percussion (9)
 Mike Crossey – keyboards, programming (5)
 Nick Mira – programming (7)
 Tom Pallant – background vocals (9, 11)
 Matt Schwartz – keyboards, programming (9); bass guitar, guitar, programming (13)
 Machine Gun Kelly – vocals (12)
 Dan Reynolds – vocals (15)

Technical
 Chris Gehringer – mastering (1, 3, 5–14)
 Joe LaPorta – mastering (2)
 Neal Avron – mixing (1, 2, 4–11, 13, 14), engineering (1, 2, 5–11, 13, 14)
 Serban Ghenea – mixing (3)
 Adam Hawkins – mixing, engineering (12)
 John Hanes – engineering (3)
 K Thrash – engineering (12)
 Matt Malpass – engineering (12)
 Shaan Singh – engineering (12)
 Zakk Cervini – recording (1, 3, 5–9, 11, 13, 14)
 Stevens – recording (5)
 Matt Schwartz – recording (9, 13)

Charts

Certifications

References

2020 albums
Yungblud albums
Albums postponed due to the COVID-19 pandemic
Interscope Records albums